William Gibson is an American-Canadian writer who has been called the "noir prophet" of the cyberpunk subgenre of science fiction. Since first being published in the late 1970s, Gibson has written more than twenty short stories and nine critically acclaimed novels. His early works are bleak, noir near-future stories about the relationship between humans and technology – a "combination of lowlife and high tech". Several of these garnered critical attention and popular acclaim, receiving Hugo and Nebula Awards nominations in the categories of best short story and best novelette and being featured prominently in the annual Locus Awards reader's poll.

The themes, settings and characters developed in these stories culminated in his first novel, Neuromancer (1984), which proved to be the author's breakout work, achieving critical and commercial success and virtually initiating the cyberpunk literary genre. It became the first novel to win the "triple crown" of science fiction awards – the Nebula and the Hugo Awards for best novel along with the Philip K. Dick Award for paperback original, an unprecedented achievement described by the Mail & Guardian as "the sci-fi writer's version of winning the Goncourt, Booker and Pulitzer prizes in the same year". It also won the Ditmar and Seiun awards, received nominations for the year's "outstanding work" Prix Aurora Award and the British Science Fiction Association (BSFA) award for best novel, topped the annual Science Fiction Chronicle poll and finishing third in the standings for the 1985 John W. Campbell Award.

Much of Gibson's reputation remained associated with Neuromancer, and though its sequels in the Sprawl trilogy – Count Zero (1986) and Mona Lisa Overdrive (1988) – also attracted  Hugo and Nebula nominations for best novel, major award wins eluded the writer thereafter. "The Winter Market", a short story first published in November 1985, was well-received, garnering Hugo, Nebula, Aurora, and BSFA nominations and finished highly in the Locus, Interzone and Science Fiction Chronicle polls. Having completed the cyberpunk Sprawl trilogy, Gibson became a central figure in the steampunk subgenre by co-authoring the 1990 alternate history novel The Difference Engine, which was nominated for the Nebula, Campbell, Aurora and BSFA awards and featured in the Locus poll. His most recent novels – Pattern Recognition (2003) and Spook Country (2007) – put his work onto mainstream bestseller lists for the first time, and the former was the first of Gibson's novels to be shortlisted for the Arthur C. Clarke Award. Gibson was inducted into the Science Fiction Hall of Fame in 2008.

Awards

Hugo Award
The Hugo Awards are given every year for the best science fiction or fantasy works and achievements of the previous year. The nominees and winners are chosen by members of the annual Worldcon convention. Gibson has won one award, the Hugo Award for Best Novel for his Neuromancer in 1985, and has been nominated on five other occasions.

|-
| 1985|| Neuromancer|| Hugo Award for Best Novel||   || align="center"|—
|-ditmar
| 1986|| "Dogfight" || Hugo Award for Best Novelette|| || Co-authored with Michael Swanwick
|-
| 1987||  "The Winter Market"|| Hugo Award for Best Novelette||  || align="center"|—
|-
| 1987|| Count Zero|| Hugo Award for Best Novel||  || align="center"|—
|-
| 1989|| Mona Lisa Overdrive|| Hugo Award for Best Novel||   || align="center"|—
|-
| 1994|| Virtual Light|| Hugo Award for Best Novel||  || align="center"|—

Nebula Award
The Nebula Award is an award given each year to the best science fiction or fantasy fiction published in the United States during the two previous years. It is awarded by the Science Fiction and Fantasy Writers of America, whose members determine the nominations and winners. Gibson's only Nebula Award was for Neuromancer in 1985, though he has received seven other nominations.

|-
| 1982|| "Johnny Mnemonic"|| Nebula Award for Best Short Story||  || Originally published in 1981
|-
|1983|| "Burning Chrome"|| Nebula Award for Best Novelette||  || Originally published in 1982
|-
|1985|| Neuromancer|| Nebula Award for Best Novel ||  || Originally published in 1984
|-
|1987|| "The Winter Market"|| Nebula Award for Best Novelette ||  || Originally published in 1985
|-
|1986|| "Dogfight"|| Nebula Award for Best Novelette || ||Co-authored with Michael Swanwick; originally published in 1985
|-
|1987|| Count Zero || Nebula Award for Best Novel || || Originally published in 1985
|-
|1989|| Mona Lisa Overdrive|| Nebula Award for Best Novel ||  || Originally published in 1988
|-
|1992|| The Difference Engine|| Nebula Award for Best Novel ||  ||Co-authored with Bruce Sterling; originally published in 1990

John W. Campbell Memorial Award
The John W. Campbell Memorial Award for Best Science Fiction Novel is awarded by a jury to an outstanding novel published during the previous year. Gibson has been nominated twice for the award, but has not won.

|-
| 1985|| Neuromancer|| John W. Campbell Memorial Award for Best Science Fiction Novel ||   || align="center"|—
|-
| 1992|| The Difference Engine|| John W. Campbell Memorial Award for Best Science Fiction Novel ||   || Co-authored with Bruce Sterling

Philip K. Dick Award
The Philip K. Dick Award is awarded annually by a jury of writers and academics to the best original science fiction paperback published in the United States. Neuromancer won the award in 1984, and Gibson sat on the jury of the 1986 award.

Arthur C. Clarke Award
The Arthur C. Clarke Award is a British award given for the best science fiction novel first published in the United Kingdom during the previous year as determined by a panel of judges from the British Science Fiction Association, the Science Fiction Foundation and a third selected organization. Gibson's Pattern Recognition (2003) was shortlisted for the award in 2004.

Prix Aurora Award
The Prix Aurora Awards are granted annually by the Canadian SF and Fantasy Association (and chosen by its members) for the best Canadian science fiction and fantasy. Gibson won the best Long-form English work award twice, and received four other nominations.

|-
|1985 ||Neuromancer || Outstanding work ||  || align="center"|—
|-
| 1986 ||"The Winter Market" || Short-form, English  ||  || align="center"|—
|-
|1989 ||Mona Lisa Overdrive || Long-form, English  ||  || align="center"|—
|-
|1992 ||The Difference Engine || Long-form, English ||  || Co-authored with Bruce Sterling
|-
|1994 ||Virtual Light || Long-form, English ||  || align="center"|—
|-
|1995 ||Virtual Light || Long-form, English ||  || align="center"|—

BSFA Awards
The British Science Fiction Association (BSFA) annually presents four awards, traditionally on the basis of a vote of its members. Gibson has been nominated for an award on six occasions, but has not won.

|-
| 1985 ||Neuromancer || Novel ||   || align="center"|—
|-
|1987 ||"The Winter Market" || Short story ||   || align="center"|—
|-
|1987 ||Count Zero || Novel ||   || align="center"|—
|-
|1991 ||The Difference Engine || Novel ||   || Co-authored with Bruce Sterling
|-
|2004 ||Pattern Recognition || Novel ||   || align="center"|—
|-
|2007 ||Spook Country || Novel ||   || align="center"|—

Ditmar Award
The Ditmar Award is granted by the members of the annual Australian National Science Fiction Convention (the "Natcon") to recognize achievement in Australian science fiction, fantasy and horror and its fandom. Gibson has been nominated for two awards, winning for Neuromancer in 1985.

|-
| 1985||Neuromancer|| International novel ||   || align="center"|—
|-
| 1989||Mona Lisa Overdrive|| International novel ||   || align="center"|—

Seiun Award
The Seiun Award is awarded for the best science fiction published in Japan during the preceding year, as decided by a vote of attendees of the Japan Science Fiction Convention. Gibson won once, for Neuromancer in 1987, and received a second nomination for All Tomorrow's Parties in 2001.

|-
| 1987||Neuromancer || Best Foreign Language Novel of the Year ||  || align="center"|—
|-
| 2001||All Tomorrow's Parties || Best Foreign Language Novel of the Year ||  || align="center"|—

Italia Awards
Conferred by vote at the annual Italcon, the Italia Awards have been granted since 1972. Gibson's Virtual Light was nominated in the inaugural "International novel" category in 1995, finishing second.

Southeastern SF Awards
The Southeastern SF Awards recognizing achievements in fantasy, horror and science fiction by authors connected to the Southeastern United States, were granted from 2002 to 2006 by a vote of members. Gibson, a native of South Carolina who grew up in Virginia, was recognized in 2004, when Pattern Recognition was shortlisted for the Southeastern SF Achievement Award.

EFF Pioneer Awards
The EFF Pioneer Awards recognize leaders on the electronic frontier who are extending freedom and innovation in the realm of information technology. This was awarded to Gibson in September 2019.

Polls

Locus
The Locus Awards are presented to winners of Locus magazine's annual reader's poll. For each category of award, readers submit five nominations in order of preference, with the leading work declared the winner. As such, the number of nominated works per category varies from year to year. Though none of Gibson's works have claimed first position, they have polled twenty-four times.

|-
| 1981||"The Gernsback Continuum"|| Short story || || align="center"|—
|-
| 1982||"Hinterlands"|| Short story || || align="center"|—
|-
| 1982||"Johnny Mnemonic"|| Novelette  || || align="center"|—
|-
| 1983||"Burning Chrome"|| Novelette  || || align="center"|—
|-
| 1984||"Red Star, Winter Orbit"|| Novelette  || || Co-authored with Bruce Sterling
|-
| 1985||Neuromancer|| Locus Award for Best First Novel || || align="center"|—
|-
| 1985||Neuromancer|| Locus Award for Best Science Fiction Novel || || align="center"|—
|-
| 1985||"New Rose Hotel"|| Short story || || align="center"|—
|-
| 1985||"Dogfight"|| Short novelette  || || Co-authored with Michael Swanwick
|-
| 1987||Burning Chrome|| Collection|| || align="center"|—
|-
| 1987||Count Zero|| Locus Award for Best Science Fiction Novel || || align="center"|—
|-
| 1987||"The Winter Market"|| Novelette  || || align="center"|—
|-
| 1989||Mona Lisa Overdrive|| Novel  || || align="center"|—
|-
| 1991||The Difference Engine|| Locus Award for Best Science Fiction Novel || || Co-authored with Bruce Sterling
|-
| 1992||"Skinner's Room"|| Short story|| || align="center"|—
|-
| 1992||The Difference Engine|| Locus Award for Best Science Fiction Novel || || Co-authored with Bruce Sterling
|-
| 1994||Virtual Light || Locus Award for Best Science Fiction Novel || || align="center"|—
|-
| 1997||Idoru|| Locus Award for Best Science Fiction Novel || || align="center"|—
|-
| 1998||Neuromancer|| All-time science fiction novel (before 1990)|| || align="center"|—
|-
| 1999||"Burning Chrome"|| All-time novelette|| || align="center"|—
|-
| 1999||Burning Chrome|| All-time collection|| || align="center"|—
|-
| 2000||All Tomorrow's Parties|| Locus Award for Best Science Fiction Novel || || align="center"|—
|-
| 2004||Pattern Recognition|| Locus Award for Best Science Fiction Novel || || align="center"|—
|-
| 2008||Spook Country|| Locus Award for Best Science Fiction Novel || || align="center"|—
|-
| 2015||The Peripheral|| Locus Award for Best Science Fiction Novel || || align="center"|—
|-
| 2021||Agency (novel)|| Locus Award for Best Science Fiction Novel || || align="center"|—

Interzone
The annual Interzone Poll is conducted by readers of the British science fiction magazine Interzone. Gibson's short story "The Winter Market" polled third in the fiction category in 1987.

Science Fiction Chronicle
The semiprozine Science Fiction Chronicle of Andrew I. Porter conducted a reader's poll from 1982 to 1998. Gibson claimed first place once, for Neuromancer in 1985, and finished in the top three on four other occasions.

|-
|1983 || "Burning Chrome" || Novelette ||  || align="center"|—
|-
|1985 || Neuromancer || Novel ||  || align="center"|—
|-
|1986 || "Dogfight" || Novelette ||  || Co-authored with Michael Swanwick
|-
|1987 ||"The Winter Market" || Novelette ||  || align="center"|—
|-
|1987 ||Count Zero || Novel ||  || align="center"|—

Career honours
In addition to the recognition of his individual works, Gibson has been accorded several career honours. In a 1989 Interzone poll to determine the All-time best SF author, Gibson finished 19th, while in the Locus All-Time Poll taken a decade later, he was tied at 42nd for the All time short fiction writer. He received nominations for a Life achievement Southeastern SF Achievement Award in 2005 and 2006, and was inducted into the Science Fiction Hall of Fame in 2008. In October 2014, Gibson was inducted into the Canadian Science Fiction and Fantasy Association (CSFFA) Hall of Fame. In January 2019, he was named the 35th Damon Knight Grand Master by The Science Fiction and Fantasy Writers of America (SFWA, Inc.) for his contributions to the literature of Science Fiction and Fantasy recognizing his “lifetime achievement in science fiction and/or fantasy.”

Related pages
 List of works by William Gibson

References

External links
 

William Gibson
Lists of awards received by writer